The canton of Grand-Bas-Armagnac is an administrative division of the Gers department, southwestern France. It was created at the French canton reorganisation which came into effect in March 2015. Its seat is in Nogaro.

It consists of the following communes:
 
Arblade-le-Haut
Ayzieu
Bétous
Bourrouillan
Campagne-d'Armagnac
Castex-d'Armagnac
Caupenne-d'Armagnac
Cazaubon
Cravencères
Espas
Estang
Le Houga
Lannemaignan
Lanne-Soubiran
Larée
Laujuzan
Lias-d'Armagnac
Loubédat
Luppé-Violles
Magnan
Manciet
Marguestau
Mauléon-d'Armagnac
Maupas
Monclar
Monguilhem
Monlezun-d'Armagnac
Mormès
Nogaro
Panjas
Perchède
Réans
Sainte-Christie-d'Armagnac
Saint-Griède
Saint-Martin-d'Armagnac
Salles-d'Armagnac
Sion
Sorbets
Toujouse
Urgosse

References

Cantons of Gers